Peter Brown is head of education at the Institute of Investing and Financial Trading (IIFT) and also financial advisor at Baggot Asset Management. He is recognisable as a financial commentator on radio and television in Ireland, appearing on shows such as Tonight with Vincent Browne, Today with Pat Kenny, RTÉ News at One and Newstalk. Brown has worked in Barclays Bank, Citi Bank, Banque National de Paris and Ulster Bank.

References

External links
 

Living people
Year of birth missing (living people)